Fortune 410 is the fourth album by American rock singer Donnie Iris, released in 1983. (The album title refers to the style of eyeglasses worn by Iris.)  The album was reissued in remastered form on CD in 2021 by Rock Candy Records with a live bonus track from the 1981 Live EP.

Track listing

Side one
 "Human Evolution" (Avsec, Iris, Lee, McClain, Valentine) - 3:10
 "Stagedoor Johnny" (Avsec, Lee, Iris) - 3:45
 "Cry If You Want To" (Avsec, Iris) - 3:12
 "Tell Me What You Want" (Avsec, Lee, Iris) - 3:20	
 "I Belong" (Avsec) - 4:57

Side two
 "She's So European" (Avsec, Iris) - 3:24
 "I'm a User" (Avsec, Iris) - 2:36
 "Never Did I" (McClain) - 3:56
 "Somebody" (Avsec, Iris) - 3:50
 "Do You Compute?" (Avsec, Iris) - 3:40

2021 remastered CD reissue
 "Human Evolution" - 3:15
 "Stagedoor Johnny" - 3:48
 "Cry If You Want To" - 3:14
 "Tell Me What You Want" - 3:21	
 "I Belong" - 5:00
 "She's So European" - 3:25
 "I'm a User" - 2:38
 "Never Did I" - 3:58
 "Somebody" - 3:52
 "Do You Compute?" - 3:43
 "The Rapper (Live)" - 3:44

Personnel

Donnie Iris and the Cruisers
Donnie Iris - lead and background vocals
Mark Avsec - piano, organ, synthesizers, background vocals
Marty Lee Hoenes - guitars and background vocals
Albritton McClain - bass guitar and background vocals
Kevin Valentine - drums and percussion

Additional musicians
Rick Bell, saxophone
Dan McCarthy, trumpet

Production
Executive Producer: Carl Maduri & Chris Maduri
Producer: Mark Avsec
Engineer: Carl Maduri III

Charts
Album - Billboard (United States)

Singles - Billboard (United States)

References

External links
Donnie Iris – Fortune 410 (2021, CD)

Donnie Iris albums
1983 albums
Albums produced by Mark Avsec
MCA Records albums